Akron is the fifth-largest city in the U.S. state of Ohio and is the county seat of Summit County. At the 2020 census, the city proper had a total population of 190,469, making it the 125th largest city in the United States. The Akron metropolitan area, covering Summit and Portage counties, had an estimated population of 703,505.

The city was founded in 1825 by Simon Perkins and Paul Williams, along the Little Cuyahoga River at the summit of the developing Ohio and Erie Canal. The name is derived from the Ancient Greek word ἄκρον : ákron signifying a summit or high point. It was briefly renamed South Akron after Eliakim Crosby founded nearby North Akron in 1833, until both merged into an incorporated village in 1836. In the 1910s, Akron doubled in population, making it the nation's fastest-growing city.

A long history of rubber and tire manufacturing, carried on today by The Goodyear Tire & Rubber Company, gave Akron the nickname "Rubber Capital of the World". It was once known as a center of airship development. Today, its economy includes manufacturing, education, healthcare, and biomedical research; leading corporations include Gojo Industries, FirstEnergy, Huntington Bank, and Charter Spectrum.

Notable historic events in Akron include the passage of the Akron School Law of 1847, which created the K–12 system; the popularization of the church architectural Akron Plan, the foundation of Alcoholics Anonymous, the Akron Experiment into preventing goiters with iodized salt, the 1983 Supreme Court case City of Akron v. Akron Center for Reproductive Health; and portions of the 2014 Gay Games. A racially diverse city, it has seen noted racial relations speeches by Sojourner Truth in 1851—the Ain't I A Woman? speech; W. E. B. Du Bois in 1920; and President Bill Clinton in 1997. In 1914, Marcus Garvey founded the Universal Negro Improvement Association in Akron. Episodes of major civil unrest in Akron have included the riot of 1900, rubber strike of 1936, and the Wooster Avenue riots of 1968.

History

In 1811, Paul Williams settled near the corner of what is now Buchtel Avenue and Broadway. He suggested to General Simon Perkins, who was surveyor of the Connecticut Land Company's Connecticut Western Reserve, that they found a town at the summit of the developing Ohio and Erie Canal. It was laid out in December 1825, where the south part of the downtown Akron neighborhood sits today. Irish laborers working on the Ohio Canal built about 100 cabins nearby.

After Eliakim Crosby founded "North Akron" (also known as Cascade) in the northern portion of what is now downtown Akron in 1833, "South" was added to Akron's name until about three years later, when the two were merged and became an incorporated village in 1836. In 1840, Summit County formed from portions of Portage, Medina, and Stark Counties. Akron replaced Cuyahoga Falls as its county seat a year later and opened a canal connecting to Beaver, Pennsylvania, helping give birth to the stoneware, sewer pipe, fishing tackle, and farming equipment industries. In 1844, abolitionist John Brown moved into the John Brown House across the street from business partner Colonel Simon Perkins, who lived in the Perkins Stone Mansion. The Akron School Law of 1847 founded the city's public schools and created the K–12 grade school system, which currently is used in every U.S. state. The city's first school is now a museum on Broadway Street near the corner of Exchange.

1850s–1890s: Summit City
When the Ohio Women's Rights Convention came to Akron in 1851, Sojourner Truth extemporaneously delivered her speech named "Ain't I A Woman?", at the Universalist Old Stone Church. In 1870, a local businessman associated with the church, John R. Buchtel, founded Buchtel College, which became the University of Akron in 1913.

Ferdinand Schumacher bought a mill in 1856, and the following decade mass-produced oat bars for the Union Army during the American Civil War; these continued to sell well after the war. Akron incorporated as a city in 1865. Philanthropist Lewis Miller, Walter Blythe, and architect Jacob Snyder designed the widely used Akron Plan, debuting it on Akron's First Methodist Episcopal Church in 1872. Numerous Congregational, Baptist, and Presbyterian churches built between the 1870s and World War I use it. In 1883, a local journalist began the modern toy industry by founding the Akron Toy Company. A year later, the first popular toy was mass-produced clay marbles made by Samuel C. Dyke at his shop where Lock 3 Park is now. Other popular inventions include rubber balloons, ducks, dolls, balls, baby buggy bumpers, and little brown jugs. In 1895, the first long-distance electric railway, the Akron, Bedford and Cleveland Railroad, began service. On August 25, 1889, the Boston Daily Globe referred to Akron with the nickname "Summit City". To help local police, the city deployed the first police car in the U.S. that ran on electricity.

1900s–1990s: Rubber Capital of the World

The Riot of 1900 saw assaults on city officials, two deaths, and the destruction by fire of Columbia Hall and the Downtown Fire Station (now the City Building since 1925). The American trucking industry was birthed through Akron's Rubber Capital of the World era when the four major tire companies Goodrich Corporation (1869), Goodyear Tire and Rubber Company (1898), Firestone Tire and Rubber Company (1900), and General Tire (1915) were headquartered in the city. The numerous jobs the rubber factories provided for deaf people led to Akron being nicknamed the "Crossroads of the Deaf". On Easter Sunday 1913, 9.55 inches of rain fell, causing floods that killed five people and destroyed the Ohio and Erie Canal system. From 1916 to 1920, 10,000 schoolgirls took part in the successful Akron Experiment, testing iodized salt to prevent goiter in what was known as the "Goiter Belt".

Rubber companies responded to housing crunches by building affordable housing for workers. Goodyear's president, F.A. Seiberling, built the Goodyear Heights neighborhood for employees. Likewise, Harvey Firestone built the Firestone Park neighborhood for his employees. During the 1910–1920 decade, Akron became a boomtown, being America's fastest growing city with a 201.8% increase in population. Of the 208,000 citizens, almost one-third were immigrants (also Clark Gable) and their children from places including Europe and West Virginia. In 1929 and 1931 Goodyear's subsidiary Goodyear-Zeppelin Company manufactured two airships for the United States Navy, USS Akron (ZRS-4) and USS Macon (ZRS-5). Goodyear built a number of blimps for the Navy during WWII and later for advertising purposes. Akron again grew when Kenmore was annexed by voter approval on November 6, 1928. Found hiding under a bed at one of his hideouts in the city, notorious bank robber Charles Arthur "Pretty Boy" Floyd was arrested under the name "Frank Mitchell" in March 1930. Goodyear became America's top tire manufacturer after merging with The Kelly-Springfield Tire Company in 1935. Lasting five weeks and consisting of roughly 5,000 strikers including union sympathizers from other factories and neighboring states, the Akron Rubber Strike of 1936 successfully used "sit-down" tactic being organized by the United Rubber Workers. During the 1950s–60s Akron surged as use of the automobile did. The historic Rubber Bowl was used by the National Guard of the United States as a base during the racial Wooster Avenue Riots of 1968. Like many other industries of the Rust Belt, both the tire and rubber industries experienced major decline. By the early 1990s, Goodyear was the last major tire manufacturer based in Akron.

2000s: City of Invention

Despite the number of rubber workers decreasing by roughly half from 2000 to 2007, Akron's research in polymers gained an international reputation. It now centers the Polymer Valley which consist of 400 polymer-related companies, of which 94 were located in the city itself. Research is focused at the University of Akron, which is home to the Goodyear Polymer Center and the National Polymer Innovation Center, and the College of Polymer Science and Polymer Engineering. Because of its contributions to the Information Age, Newsweek listed Akron fifth of ten high-tech havens in 2001. In 2008 "City of Invention" was added to the seal when the All-America City Award was received for the third time. Some events of the 2014 Gay Games used the city as a venue. In 2013, The Goodyear Tire & Rubber Company opened its new global headquarters on Innovation Way, further cementing the company's relationship with the city .

The city also continues to deal with the effects of air and soil pollution from its industrial past. In the southwestern part of the city, soil was contaminated and noxious PCB-laden fumes were put into the air by an electrical transformer deconstruction operation that existed from the 1930s to the 1960s. Cleanup of the site, designated as a Superfund site by the Environmental Protection Agency, began in 1987 and concluded in 2000. The area remains restricted with regular reviews of the site and its underground aquifer.

Racial history

City founder Simon Perkins negotiated a treaty with Native Americans to establish a mail route from the Connecticut Western Reserve to Detroit in 1807, an early example of historic humanitarian affairs in Akron. Aside from being part of the Underground Railroad, when active, John Brown was a resident, today having two landmarks (John Brown House) and the (John Brown Monument) dedicated to him. During the 1851 Women's Rights Convention, Sojourner Truth delivered her speech entitled "Ain't I A Woman?". In 1905, a statue of an Indian named Unk was erected on Portage Path, which was part of the effective western boundary of the White and Native American lands from 1785 to 1805. The Summit County chapter of the Ku Klux Klan reported having 50,000 members, making it the largest local chapter in the country during the 20th century. At some point the sheriff, county officials, mayor of Akron, judges, county commissioners, and most members of Akron's school board were members. The Klan's influence in the city's politics eventually ended after Wendell Willkie arrived and challenged them. Race took part in two of Akron's major riots, the Riot of 1900 and the Wooster Ave. Riots of 1968. Others giving speeches on race in the city include W. E. B. Du Bois (1920) and President Bill Clinton (1997). In 1971, Alpha Phi Alpha Homes Inc. was founded in Akron by the Eta Tau Lambda chapter, with James R. Williams as chairman. The centerpiece, Henry Arthur Callis Tower, is located in the Channelwood Village area of the city. In 2008, 91-year-old Akron native, Addie Polk, became the poster child of the financial crisis of 2007–2010, after shooting herself.

Geography
It is bordered by Cuyahoga Falls on the north and Barberton in the southwest. It is the center of the Akron metropolitan area which covers Summit and Portage Counties, and a principal city of the larger Cleveland–Akron–Canton Combined Statistical Area. Located on the western end of the plateau, the topography of Akron includes rolling hills and varied terrain. The Ohio and Erie Canal passes through the city, separating the east from west. Akron has the only biogas facility in the United States that produces methane through the decomposition process of sludge to create electricity.

Climate
Akron has a humid continental climate (Köppen Dfa), typical of the Midwest, with four distinct seasons, and lies in USDA hardiness zone 6b, degrading to zone 6a in the outlying suburbs. Winters are cold and dry but typically bring a mix of rain, sleet, and snow with occasional heavy snowfall and icing. Springs generally see a transition to fewer weather systems that produce heavier rainfall. Summers are typically very warm and humid with temperatures at or above  on 8.0 days per year on average; the annual count has been as high as 36 days in 1931, while the most recent year to not reach that mark is 2004. Autumn is relatively dry with many clear warm days and cool nights.

The most precipitation to fall on one calendar day was on July 7, 1943, when 5.96" of rain was measured. The first and last freezes of the season on average fall on October 18 and April 26, respectively, allowing a growing season of 174 days.

Neighborhoods

Akron consists of 21 neighborhoods, with an additional three that are unincorporated but recognized within the city. The neighborhoods of the city differ in design largely because of expansions such as town merging, annexation, housing construction in various time periods, and rubber era.

Maple Valley covers the west end of Copley Road, before reaching I-77. Along this strip are several businesses using the name, as well as the Maple Valley Branch of the Akron-Summit County Public Library. Spicertown falls under the blanket of University Park, this term is used frequently to describe the student-centered retail and residential area around East Exchange and Spicer streets, near the University of Akron. West Hill is roughly bounded by West Market Street on the north, West Exchange Street on the south, Downtown on the East, and Rhodes Avenue on the west. It features many stately older homes, particularly in the recently recognized Oakdale Historic District.

Suburbs
Akron's suburbs include Barberton, Cuyahoga Falls, Fairlawn, Green, Hudson, Mogadore, Montrose-Ghent, Munroe Falls, Norton, Silver Lake, Stow, and Tallmadge. Akron formed Joint Economic Development Districts with Springfield, Coventry, Copley, and Bath (in conjunction with Fairlawn) townships.

Demographics

According to census data from 2010 to 2014, the median income for a household in the city was $34,139. The per capita income for the city was $17,596. About 26.7% of persons were in poverty.

Akron has a metropolitan population of 703,203 (U.S. Census Bureau, 2010). Akron is also part of the larger Cleveland-Akron-Canton Combined Statistical Area, which was the 15th largest in the country with a population of over 3.5 million according to the 2010 Census.

2010 census
As of the census of 2010, there were 199,110 people, 83,712 households, and 47,084 families residing in the city. The racial makeup of the city was 62.2% White, 31.5% African American, 0.2% Native American, 2.1% Asian, 0.8% from other races, and 3.2% from two or more races. Hispanic or Latino of any race were 2.1% of the population. Non-Hispanic Whites were 61.2% of the population, down from 81.0% in 1970.

There were 83,712 households, of which 28.8% had children under age 18 living with them, 31.3% were married couples living together, 19.5% had a female householder with no husband present, 5.5% had a male householder with no wife present, and 43.8% were non-families. 34.8% of all households were made up of individuals, and 10.8% had someone living alone who was 65 years of age or older. The average household size was 2.31 and the average family size was 2.98.

The median age in the city was 35.7 years. 22.9% of residents were under age 18; 12.4% were between 18 and 24; 25.9% were from 25 to 44; 25.9% were from 45 to 64; and 12.6% were 65 or older. The gender makeup of the city was 48.3% male and 51.7% female.

2020 census 
As of the census of 2020 there were 190,469 people and 84,940 households. This all leads to a population density of 3,181.30/sq mi. The average number of people living in a household was 2.27 persons per households. The racial makeup of the city was 59.9% White, 30.3% Black or African American, .2% Native American, 4.6% Asian, with 5% coming from other races. 3.1% is of Hispanic origin.

The mean age in the city was 35.7 years old. 6% of the population is under the age of 5, 21.2% are under the age of 18, 14.8% are over the age of 65. 52.1% of the population is female.

Spoken dialects
Although Akron is in northern Ohio, where the Inland North dialect is expected, its settlement history puts it in the North Midland dialect area. Some localisms that have developed include devilstrip, which refers to the grass strip between a sidewalk and street.

Crime

In 1999, Akron ranked as the 94th-most-dangerous city (and the 229th safest) on the 7th Morgan Quitno list. Preliminary Ohio crime statistics show aggravated assaults increased by 45% during 2007.

Historically, organized crime operated in the city with the presence of the Black Hand led by Rosario Borgio, once headquartered on the city's north side in the first decade of the 20th century and the Walker-Mitchell mob, of which Pretty Boy Floyd was a member. Akron has experienced several riots in its history, including the Riot of 1900 and the Wooster Avenue Riots of 1968.

The distribution of methamphetamine ("meth") in Akron greatly contributed to Summit County becoming known as the "Meth Capital of Ohio" in the early 2000s. The county ranked third in the nation in the number of registered meth sites. During the 1990s, motorcycle gang the Hells Angels sold the drug from bars frequented by members. Between January 2004 and August 2009, the city had significantly more registered sites than any other city in the state. Authorities believed a disruption of a major Mexican meth operation contributed to the increase of it being made locally. In 2007, the Akron Police Department (APD) received a grant to help continue its work with other agencies and jurisdictions to support them in ridding the city of meth labs. The APD coordinates with the Summit County Drug Unit and the Drug Enforcement Administration, forming the Clandestine Methamphetamine Laboratory Response Team.

Economy

Many industries in the United States either began or were influenced by the city. After beginning the tire and rubber industry during the 20th century with the founding of Goodrich, Firestone, General Tire, and also the Goodyear merger with The Kelly-Springfield Tire Company, Akron gained the status of "Rubber Capital of the World". Akron has won economic awards such as for City Livability and All-American City, and deemed a high tech haven greatly contributing to the Information Age. Current Fortune 500 companies headquartered in the city include the Goodyear Tire and Rubber Company and FirstEnergy. In addition, the city is the headquarters to a number of other notable companies such as GOJO, Advanced Elastomer Systems, Babcock & Wilcox, Myers Industries, Acme Fresh Market and Sterling Jewelers. Goodyear, America's biggest tire manufacturer and the fifth-largest private employer in Summit County, recently built a new world headquarters in the city. The project, Akron Riverwalk, will feature a large retail and commercial development area. The project began in 2007, but was put on hold because of the financial crisis of 2007–2010, and is now continuing. Bridgestone built a new technical center with state-of-the-art R&D labs, and moved its product development operations to the new facility in early 2012. The Eastern Ohio Division of KeyBank, which has six branches in the city, built a regional headquarters downtown. The city has a free WiFi corridor centered in downtown. Neighborhoods in range include Goodyear Heights, East Akron, North Hill, Firestone Park, Kenmore, and West Akron.

Polymer Valley
Northeast Ohio's Polymer Valley is centered in Akron. The area holds forty-five percent of the state's polymer industries, with the oldest dating to the 19th century. During the 1980s and 1990s, an influx of new polymer companies came to the region. In 2001, more than 400 companies manufactured polymer-based materials in the region. Many University of Akron scientists became world-renowned for their research done at the Goodyear Polymer Center. The first College of Polymer Science and Polymer Engineering was begun by the university. In 2010, the National Polymer Innovation Center opened on campus.

Hospitals

Akron has designated an area called the Biomedical Corridor, aimed at luring health-related ventures to the region. It encompasses  of private and publicly owned land, bounded by Akron General on the west and Akron City on the east, and also includes Akron Children's near the district's center with the former Saint Thomas Hospital to the north of its northern boundaries. Since its start in 2006, the corridor added the headquarters of companies such as Akron Polymer Systems.

Akron's adult hospitals are owned by two health systems, Summa Health System and Akron General Health System. Summa Health System operates Akron City Hospital and the former St. Thomas Hospital, which in 2008 were recognized for the 11th consecutive year as one of "America's Best Hospitals" by U.S. News & World Report. Summa is recognized as having one of the best orthopaedics programs in the nation with a ranking of 28th. Akron General Health in affiliation with the Cleveland Clinic operates Akron General Medical Center, which in 2009, was recognized as one of "America's Best Hospitals" by U.S. News & World Report. Akron Children's Hospital is an independent entity that specializes in pediatric care and burn care. In 1974, Dr. Howard Igel and Dr. Aaron Freeman successfully grew human skin in a lab to treat burn victims, making Akron Children's Hospital the first hospital in the world to achieve such a feat. Akron City and Akron General hospitals are designated Level I Trauma Centers.

Top employers
According to the city's 2020 Comprehensive Annual Financial Report, the principal employers in the city are:

Arts and culture

Akron is home to E. J. Thomas Hall, one of three Akron performance halls. Regular acts include the Akron Symphony Orchestra, Tuesday Musical Club, and Children's Concert Society. World-class performances events include Broadway musicals, ballets, comedies, lectures, entertainers, attracting 400,000 visitors annually. The hall seats 2,955, divided among three tiers. To maintain top-notch acoustic sound, the counter-weighted ceiling is adjustable, altering the physical dimensions of the hall. Located downtown is the Akron Civic Theatre, which opened in 1929 as the Loew's Theater. This atmospheric-style theater was designed by John Eberson and built by Marcus Loew. The theater contains many Moorish features including arches and decorative tiles. It features elaborate wood carvings, alabaster statuary, and European antiques. The theater seats 5,000. Behind it on the canal is the Lock 3 Park amphitheater, which annually host the First Night in Akron. The Akron Art Museum also downtown, features art produced since 1850 along with national and international exhibitions. It opened in 1922 as the Akron Art Institute, in the basement of the Akron Public Library. It moved to its current location at the renovated 1899 post office building in 1981. In 2007, the museum more than tripled in size with the addition of the John S. and James L. Knight Building, which received the 2005 American Architecture Award from the Chicago Athenaeum while still under construction.

Built between 1912 and 1915 for Frank Seiberling, Stan Hywet Hall and Gardens is the seventh-largest historic house in the United States.

Located within the Sand Run Metro Park, the  F.A. Seiberling Nature Realm features a visitor center, hiking trails, three ponds, gardens, and an array of special programs throughout the year. The Akron Police Museum displays mementos including items from Pretty Boy Floyd, whose gang frequented the city.

Akron is home to the American Marble and Toy Museum.

Architecture

As a result of multiple towns merging, and industry boom, Akron's architecture is diverse.

Originally a canal town, the city is divided into two parts by the Ohio and Erie Canal, with downtown being centered on it. Along the locks, the city has a path paved with rubber.

Akron was awarded with the City Livability Award in 2008 for its efforts to co-purpose new school buildings as community learning centers. In 2009, the National Arbor Day Foundation designated Akron as a Tree City USA for the 14th time.

Many of the city's government and civic buildings, including City Hall and the Summit County Courthouse are from pre-World War Two, but the Akron-Summit County Public Library, and John S. Knight Center are considerably newer. The library originally opened in 1969, but reopened as a greatly expanded facility in 2004. The Knight Center opened in 1994.

The First Methodist Episcopal Church first used the Akron Plan in 1872. The plan later gained popularity, being used in many Congregationalist, Baptist, and Presbyterian church buildings.

The city is home to a historic 1920s atmospheric movie palace, the Akron Civic Theatre. One of the building's features is a starry sky with clouds that drift over it when the lights are dimmed.

Completed in 1931, Akron's tallest building, the Huntington Tower, features the art deco style and is covered in glazed architectural terra-cotta. Near the turn of the millennium the tower was given a $2.5 million facelift, including a $1.8 million restoration of the tower's terra-cotta, brick, and limestone. The top of the building has a television broadcast tower formerly used by WAKR-TV (now WVPX-TV) and WAKR-AM. The antenna reaches . Located on the University of Akron campus, the Goodyear Polymer Center consists of glass twin towers connected by walkways. The university also formerly used the old Quaker Oats factory as a dormitory, including using it as a quarantine center during the COVID-19 pandemic in 2020. For many years it had been a shopping center called Quaker Square. There had also been a hotel there.

The Akron Art Museum commissioned Coop Himmelblau to design an expansion in 2007. The new building connects to the old building and is divided into three parts known as the "Crystal", the "Gallery Box", and the "Roof Cloud".

The contrasting neighborhoods of Goodyear Heights and Firestone Park were built during the rubber industry to house workers and their families. Both are communities filled with houses based on mail-order plans.

Tourism

There are numerous attractions and points of interest in the Akron area. Opened in 1922, the Akron Art Museum has a 20,000-square-foot building and a collection of art produced since 1850. Stan Hywet Hall and Gardens is the estate of F.A. Seiberling, founder of Goodyear Tire and Rubber Company. The manor hosts various attractions and public events throughout the year. In the heart of downtown, the Akron Civic Theatre has provided the community with a venue for entertainment and live performances for over eighty years. Lock 3, a historic Ohio and Erie Canalway landmark, has been transformed into an entertainment amphitheater that hosts festivals, concerts, and community events throughout the year. The Akron Zoo is located just outside downtown, and was an initial gift of property from the city's founding family. In Highland Square, Akron hosts a convergence of art, music, and community annually called Art in the Square, a festival featuring local artists and musicians.

National events hosted annually in Akron cover a wide variety of hobbies and interests. The PGA World Golf Championships travel to Akron each year for the Bridgestone Invitational at Firestone Country Club. The All-American Soap Box Derby is a youth racing program which has its World Championship finals at Derby Downs. In mid July, the National Hamburger Festival consists of different vendors serving original recipe hamburgers and has a Miss Hamburger contest. Lock 3 Park annually hosts the First Night Akron celebration on New Year's Eve. The park also annually hosts the Italian Festival and the "Rib, White & Blue" food festival in July. Founders Day is celebrated annually because of the founding of Alcoholics Anonymous within the city. The Dr. Robert Smith House is located in Akron.

Cuisine

Several residents of Akron have played a role in defining American cuisine. Ferdinand Schumacher created the first American oatmeal and is a pioneer of breakfast cereal. He also founded the Empire Barley Mill and German Mills American Oatmeal Company, which would later merge several times with other companies, with the result being the Quaker Oats Company. The Menches Brothers, are the disputed inventors of the waffle ice cream cone, caramel corn, and hamburger. Strickland's Frozen Custard is located in Akron.

Sports

The RubberDucks won the Eastern League Championship six times, most recently in 2021.

The Akron Marathon is an annual marathon in the city which offers a team relay and shorter races throughout the summer and fall.

Akron had 2 teams who won the National Basketball League in the '30s and '40s, before the foundation of the NBA.

Akron hosted some of the events of the 2014 Gay Games including the marathon, the men's and women's golf tournaments at Firestone Country Club, and softball at Firestone Stadium.

The All-American Soap Box Derby takes place each year at the Derby Downs since 1936. The Firestone Country Club, which annually hosts the WGC-Bridgestone Invitational, has in the past hosted the PGA Championship, American Golf Classic, and Rubber City Open Invitational. On January 7, 1938, Akron became the birthplace of women's professional Mud Wrestling, in a match including Professional Wrestling, WWE, and Wrestling Observer Hall of Famer, Mildred Burke. The Professional Bowlers Association started in the city during 1958. LeBron James' King for Kids bike-a-thon feature James riding with kids through the city each June. In November, the city hosts the annual Home Run for the Homeless 4-mile run.

College sports

The University of Akron's Akron Zips compete in the NCAA and the Mid-American Conference (MAC) in a variety of sports at the Division I level. The men's basketball team appeared in the NCAA Tournament in 1986, 2009, 2011, and 2013. In 2009, the Zips men's soccer team completed the regular-season undefeated, then won the NCAA Men's Division I Soccer Championship in 2010. Zippy, one of the eight female NCAA mascots, won the National Mascot of the Year contest in 2007.

Past teams
Former teams of Akron include the Akron Professionals of the National Football League who played in the historic Rubber Bowl and won the 1920 championship; the Goodyear Silents, a deaf semi-professional football; the Akron Black Tyrites of the Negro National League; the Akron Americans of the International Hockey League; the Akron Lightning of the International Basketball League; the Akron Summit Assault of the USL Premier Development League, the fourth tier of the American Soccer Pyramid; the Akron Wingfoots of the National Basketball League, who won the first NBL Championship and the International Cup three times; the Akron Firestone Non-Skids, also of the National Basketball League, who won the title consecutively, in 1939 and 1940; and the Akron Vulcans, a professional football team that played in the Continental Football League for part of the 1967 season.

Parks and recreation
Major parks in Akron include Lock 3, Firestone, Goodyear Heights, the F.A. Seiberling Nature Realm (or Naturealm), and part of the Cuyahoga Valley National Park. Several of the parks are along the locks of the canal. Lock 3 Park in downtown Akron is the city's hub for entertainment. It is commonly used as an outdoor amphitheater hosting live musical entertainment, festivals and special events year-round. The park was created in the early 21st century to provide green space within the city. The Ohio and Erie Canal can still be seen flowing behind the stage where there was once a boat yard and dry dock. Later, a pottery factory stood there until the parking deck of the M. O'Neil Co. department store was built in the current location. More than 65,000 guests use the park for recreation annually. Lock 3 Live holds concerts for almost every musical genre, including alternative, R&B, reggae, gospel, country, pop, jazz and classic rock. Some festivals the park hosts throughout the year include Soap Box Derby opening ceremonies, firefighter competitions, charity events, tournaments and animal events. From November through February, Lock 3 Park is transformed into an outdoor ice-skating rink. Adjacent to the Derby Downs race hill is a 19,000-square-foot (1,800 m2) outdoor skatepark. The park features concrete ramps, including two bowls going as deep as 7 feet (2.1 m), a snake run, two hips, a stair set with handrail, many smaller quarter pipes and a variety of grind boxes. Positioned just a few feet from the Akron Skatepark is a Pro BMX course where organized races are often held in the warmer months. Akron residents can enjoy various ice skating activities year round at the historic Akron Ice House.

The Ohio and Erie Canal Towpath Trail is a regional bike and hike trail that follows the canal. A bridge was completed in 2008, crossing Route 59/The Innerbelt, which connects the towpath proper with bike routes painted onto streets downtown, thus completing another step toward the connection of Cleveland and East Liverpool with a hike and bike trail. The State of Ohio plans to reconstruct the trail which once ran completely through Ohio, to New Philadelphia from Cleveland. The trail features a floating observation deck section over Summit Lake. It is a popular tourist attraction, as it attracts over 2 million visits annually. The Portage Hike and Bike Trail, when fully complete, will connect with the hike and bike trails in the county.

Government

The mayor of Akron is elected in a citywide vote. In 2016, the city elected its 62nd mayor. The city is divided into 10 wards, each elect a member to the Akron City Council, while an additional 3 are elected at large. The mayor's cabinet currently consist of directors and deputy directors of administration, communications, community relations, economic development, intergovernmental relations, labor relations, law, planning & urban development, planning director – deputy, public safety, and public service. The city adopted a new charter of the commissioner manager type in 1920, but reverted to its old form in 1924.

The current mayor is Dan Horrigan. Longtime Akron Mayor Don Plusquellic announced on May 8, 2015, that he would resign on May 31 after 28 years as mayor and 41 years of service to the city. On May 31, 2015, Garry Moneypenny was sworn in as the new mayor at East High School. Moneypenny was former Chief Deputy and Assistant Sheriff of the Summit County Sheriff's Department, former Springfield Township Police Department Chief of Police, and former Akron City Council President.

On June 5, 2015, less than a week after he took office, Mayor Moneypenny announced he would not run for a full term because of inappropriate contact with a city employee. Three days later, Moneypenny announced he would resign effective at midnight on June 10. Council president Jeff Fusco assumed the duties of mayor on June 11, 2015. Fusco ran for and was elected to an at-large council seat, rather than seeking a full term as mayor. Fusco also announced he would temporarily step down as Chair of the Summit County Democratic Party, because the city charter calls for the Mayor to devote his full attention to the city.

As of July 1, 2015, three Democrats and one Republican were running for Mayor of Akron. The Democratic candidates were Summit County Clerk of Courts and former ward 4 Councilman Dan Horrigan; at-large Councilman Mike Williams; and Summit County Councilman Frank Communale. Horrigan won the Democratic primary, held on September 8. In the general election, he faced the lone GOP candidate, Eddie Sipplen, an African-American criminal defense attorney. On November 3, 2015, Horrigan was elected as the 62nd mayor of the city of Akron. He took office on January 1, 2016. On November 5, 2019, Mayor Horrigan was re-elected to a second term.

The current members of City Council are:
 Ward 1 – Nancy Holland (D)
 Ward 2 – Phil Lombardo (D)
 Ward 3 – Margo Sommerville (D), President of Council
 Ward 4 – Russell C. Neal Jr. (D)
 Ward 5 – Tara Mosley–Samples (D)
 Ward 6 – Brad McKitrick (D) 
 Ward 7 – Donnie Kammer (D), 
 Ward 8 – Shammas Malik (D), 
 Ward 9 – Mike Freeman (D)
 Ward 10 – Sharon L. Connor (D), 
 At Large – Linda Omobien (D)
 At Large – Jeff Fusco (D) Vice-president of Council
 At Large – Ginger Baylor (D)
 Acting Clerk of Council – Sara Biviano (D)
 Chief of Staff - Dr. Joan M. Williams (D)

Education

Preschool, elementary, and secondary education is mainly provided by the Akron City School District. Planning of the district began in 1840, when Ansel Miller suggested to build free public schools for all children in the city, paid for by property taxes. After enduring much opposition by citizens, in 1843 Miller joined with Rev. Isaac Jennings. Three years later, Jennings became the chairman of a committee of citizens who discussed how to improve the school system. On November 21, 1846, their plan was approved unanimously by the citizens. The Ohio Legislature adopted the plan, called "An act for the support and better regulation of the Common Schools of the Town of Akron" on February 8, 1847. Akron's first public schools were established in the fall of 1847 and were led by Mortimer Leggett. The first annual report showed that it cost less than $2 a year to educate a child. In 1857 the cost of running the schools for a year was $4,200. The primary schools were taught by young women, which the Akron Board of Education justified because they could be paid less and were under the supervision of a male superintendent. From 1877 to 1952, Akron graduated students semi-annually instead of annually. 9% of the city's school-aged population were born in other countries in 1888. In the 1920s, an Americanization program was designed to help the many Akron students who were first-generation Americans. Classes were in the rubber companies and some of the schools. A "continuation school" began for working boys and girls who were required by law to have at least four hours of schooling a week. In 1924, Akron's platoon schools attracted visitors from all over the country. Being a stronghold for the Ku Klux Klan during the decade, the majority of school board and government officials were members. Their influence ended with the arrival of Wendell Willkie. During the city's 1950s boom town phase, Akron schools grew eight times faster than the city's population. In 1967, Kenmore launched the Air Force JROTC. In 1971, Jennings piloted the middle school model, which moved ninth-graders to the senior high school. In 1984, all-day kindergarten was piloted at Seiberling, Rankin and Hatton schools, and Ellet, East and Garfield high schools piloted the in-school suspension program. The district received an A+ evaluation from the state in 1987.

Akron was served by the Akron Digital Academy from 2002 to 2018, when it shut down.

As part of his charitable foundation's initiatives in the city, LeBron James founded the I Promise School, which serves underprivileged kids.

The city is home to the University of Akron. Originally Buchtel College, the school is home of the Goodyear Polymer Center and the National Polymer Innovation Center.

All Akron Public Schools are currently going through a 15-year, $800 million rebuilding process. In recent times the city's schools have been moved from "Academic Watch" to "Continuous Improvement" by the Ohio Department of Education. Akron also has many private, parochial and charter schools.

Media

Print
Akron is served in print by the daily Akron Beacon Journal, formerly the flagship newspaper of the Knight Newspapers chain; the weekly "The Akron Reporter"; and the weekly West Side Leader newspapers and the monthly magazine Akron Life. The Buchtelite newspaper is published by the University of Akron.

TV
Akron is part of the Cleveland-Akron-Canton TV market, the 18th largest market in the U.S. Within the market, WEAO (PBS), WVPX (ION), and WBNX-TV (independent) are licensed to Akron. WEAO serves Akron specifically, while WBNX and WVPX identify as "Akron/Cleveland", serving the entire market. Akron has no native news broadcast, having lost its only news station when the former WAKC became WVPX in 1996. WVPX and Cleveland's WKYC later provided a joint news program, which was cancelled in 2005.

Radio

Though it is part of a combined TV market with Cleveland, Akron is its own radio market, and served by WZIP 88.1 (Top 40 – University of Akron), WSTB 88.9 (Alternative), WAPS 91.3 (AAA), WKJA 91.9 (religious), WQMX 94.9 (Country), WONE 97.5 (Classic rock), WKDD 98.1 (Contemporary Hits), WNIR-FM 100.1 (News/talk), WHLO 640 (News/talk), WCUE 1150 (religious), and WAKR 1590/93.5 (Soft AC/Full service).

As the regional NPR affiliate, WKSU 89.7 serves all of Northeast Ohio (including both the Cleveland and Akron markets).

Film and television
Akron has served as the setting for several major studio and independent films. Inducted into the National Film Registry, Dance, Girl, Dance (1940), tells the story of two dancers from Akron who go to New York City. My Name is Bill W. (1989) tells the true story of Bill Wilson who co-founded Alcoholics Anonymous, which held its first meetings at the Stan Hywet Hall and Gardens and has over two million members today. The program's connection to the Saint Thomas Hospital is alluded to in an episode of the television series Prison Break (2005), where Michael Scofield talks to Sara Tancredi on the phone while there. The Akron Armory is used as a venue for a female wrestling team in ...All the Marbles (1981). More than a Game (2009) documents National Basketball Association player LeBron James and his St. Vincent – St. Mary High School high school basketball team's journey. In Drake's music video to Forever (2009) off the More than a Game soundtrack (2009), the iconic Goodyear's logo on top the company's theater is shown. The city has been frequently portrayed in media, from "Hell on Earth" in the television series I'm In Hell (2007), to the whereabouts of a holy woman in The Virgin of Akron, Ohio (2007). Henry Spivey of My Own Worst Enemy (2008), travels to Akron through the series many times. George Costanza in an episode of Seinfeld (1989), flies to the city. M.Y.O.B. (2008) is centered on an Akron runaway girl named Riley Veatch. Jake Foley of Jake 2.0 (2003), Pickles family of the Rugrats (1991), and J.Reid of In Too Deep (1999), and Avery Barkley of Nashville (2016) are also from the city. Akron was also in the spotlight on the television show Criminal Minds "Compromising Positions" (2010) Season 6, Episode 4. The 2015 film Room is set in Akron, filmed in Toronto with staging to signify Akron.

Infrastructure

Transportation

Airports

The primary terminal that airline passengers traveling to or from Akron use is the Akron-Canton Regional Airport, serving nearly 2 million passengers a year. It serves as an alternative for travelers to or from the Cleveland area as well. Akron Executive Airport is a general aviation airport located in and owned by the City of Akron that serves private planes. It first opened in 1929 and has operated in several different capacities since then. The airport had commercial scheduled airline service until the 1950s and it is now used for both cargo and private planes.
It is home of the Lockheed Martin Airdock, where the Goodyear airships, dirigibles, and blimps were originally stored and maintained. The Goodyear blimps are now housed outside of Akron in a facility on the shores of Wingfoot Lake in nearby Suffield Township.

Railroads

Akron Northside Station is a train station at 27 Ridge Street along the Cuyahoga Valley Scenic Railroad.

Because of the city's large rubber industry, Akron was once served by a variety of railroads that competed for the city's freight and passenger business. The largest were the Baltimore and Ohio Railroad, Erie Railroad, and the Pennsylvania Railroad. Smaller regional railroads included the Akron, Canton, and Youngstown Railroad, Northern Ohio Railway, and the Akron Barberton Belt Railroad. Today, the city is served by CSX Corporation, the Wheeling & Lake Erie Railroad, and their subsidiary Akron-Barberton-Cluster, which operate out of the W&LE's Akron Yard near Brittain Road on the eastern end of the city.

From 1891 to 1971 passenger service to points throughout the Midwest, as well as Washington and New York City, was provided at Akron Union Station. The last legacy passenger trains were the Erie Lackawanna's Lake Cities (ended, 1970) and the B&O's Shenandoah (ended, 1971). There is currently no passenger rail transportation with the elimination of Amtrak's former Three Rivers service in 2005. The nearest Amtrak service is in Alliance, Ohio or Cleveland.

Bus and public transportation

Public transportation is available through the METRO Regional Transit Authority system, whose fleet of over 200 buses and trolleys operates local routes and commuter buses into downtown Cleveland. Stark Area Regional Transit Authority (SARTA) also has a bus line running between Canton and Akron and the Portage Area Regional Transportation Authority (PARTA) runs an express route connecting the University of Akron with Kent State University.
Metro RTA operates out of the Robert K. Pfaff Transit Center on South Broadway Street. This facility, which opened in 2009, also houses inter-city bus transportation available through Greyhound Lines.

Freeways
Akron is served by two major interstate highways that bisect the city. Unlike other cities, the bisection does not occur in the Central Business District, nor do the interstates serve downtown; rather, the Akron Innerbelt and to a lesser extent Ohio State Route 8 serve these functions.
 Interstate 77 connects Marietta and Cleveland, Ohio. In Akron, it has 15 interchanges, four of which permit freeway-to-freeway movements. It runs north–south in the southern part of the city to its intersection with I-76, where it takes a westerly turn as a concurrency with Interstate 76.
 Interstate 76 connects Interstate 71 to Youngstown, Ohio, and farther. It runs east–west and has 18 interchanges in Akron, four of which are freeway-to-freeway. The East Leg was rebuilt in the 1990s to feature six lanes and longer merge lanes. The concurrency with Interstate 77 is eight lanes. The Kenmore Leg is a four-lane leg that is slightly less than two miles (3 km) long and connects to Interstate 277.
 Interstate 277 is an east–west spur that it forms with US 224 after I-76 splits to the north to form the Kenmore Leg. It is six lanes and cosigned with U.S. 224.
 The Akron Innerbelt is a six-lane,  spur from the I-76/I-77 concurrency and serves the urban core of the city. Its ramps are directional from the interstates, so it only serves west side drivers. ODOT is considering changing this design to attract more traffic to the route. The freeway comes to an abrupt end near the northern boundary of downtown where it becomes Martin Luther King Jr. Boulevard. The freeway itself is officially known as "The Martin Luther King Jr. Memorial Freeway". The freeway was originally designed to connect directly to State Route 8, but plans were laid to rest in the mid-1970s because of financial troubles.
 Ohio State Route 8 is an original state highway that is a limited access route that connects Akron's northern suburbs with Interstates 76 and 77. State Route 8's southern terminus is at the central interchange, where it meets I-76 and I-77. The second freeway in Akron to be completed, it went through a major overhaul in 2003 with new ramps and access roads. In 2007 ODOT began a project to upgrade the road to interstate highway standards north of Akron from State Route 303 to I-271, providing a high speed alternative to Cleveland.

Notable people

Akron has produced and been home to a number of notable individuals in varying fields. Its natives and residents are called "Akronites". The first postmaster of the Connecticut Western Reserve and president of its bank, General Simon Perkins (1771-1844), co-founded Akron in 1825. His son, Colonel Simon Perkins (1805-1877), while living in Akron during the same time as abolitionist John Brown (1800-1859), went into business with Brown. Wendell Willkie, the Republican nominee for president in 1940, worked in Akron as a lawyer for Firestone. Pioneering televangelist Rex Humbard rose to prominence in Akron. Beacon Journal publisher John S. Knight ran the national Knight Newspapers chain from Akron. Broadcaster Hugh Downs was born in Akron. In the mid- to late 1940s, pioneering rock 'n' roll DJ Alan Freed was musical director at Akron's WAKR. Watergate figure John Dean was born in Akron.

Noted athletes to have come from Akron include multi-time National Basketball Association Champions and MVPs LeBron James and Stephen Curry, Basketball Hall of Famers Gus "Honeycomb" Johnson and Nate "The Great" Thurmond, Major League Baseball player Thurman Munson, International Boxing Hall of Famer Gorilla Jones, WBA Heavyweight Boxing Champion Michael Dokes, Houston Texans linebacker Whitney Mercilus, former Northwestern University and Notre Dame coach Ara Parseghian, and Butch Reynolds, former world record holder in the 400 meter dash. Former NFL linebacker James Harrison was born in Akron, as was current Tennessee Titans head coach, Mike Vrabel. Clayton Murphy, professional middle-distance runner and 2016 Olympic Games bronze medalist, competed in cross country and track & field for the Akron Zips.

Performing artists to come from Akron include bands such as Ruby and the Romantics; Devo; The Black Keys; The Cramps, whose lead singer, Lux Interior, was a native of the town; rapper Ampichino; The Waitresses; and 1964 the Tribute; singers Vaughn Monroe; Chrissie Hynde, lead singer and main composer with British New Wave band The Pretenders; James Ingram; Joseph Arthur; Jani Lane; Rachel Sweet; and outlaw country singer David Allan Coe; Actors Frank Dicopoulos, David McLean, Melina Kanakaredes, Elizabeth Franz, William Boyett, Lola Albright, and Jesse White. Clark Gable and John Lithgow also lived in Akron.

Poet Rita Dove was born and grew up in Akron. She went on to become the first African-American United States Poet Laureate. Many of her poems are about or take place in Akron, foremost among them Thomas and Beulah, which earned her the 1987 Pulitzer Prize for poetry.

Owner of over 400 patents, native Stanford R. Ovshinsky invented the widely used nickel-metal hydride battery. Richard Smalley, winner of a Nobel Prize in Chemistry for discovering buckminsterfullerene (buckyballs) was born in the city during 1943. Another native, the second U.S. female astronaut in space, Judith Resnik, died in the 1986 Space Shuttle Challenger disaster and has the Resnik Moon crater named in her honor.

The Silver Screen, which came to symbolize Hollywood's movie entertainment industry, was invented by Kenmore resident and projectionist Harry Coulter Williams. First used in Akron's Majestic Theater and then Norka Theater, the "Williams Perlite" tear-proof, vinyl plastic indoor motion picture screen was installed in all the major movie houses, including the rapidly expanding theaters built by Warner Bros. of nearby Youngstown OH. Williams' unique silver-painted screens were adapted for CinemaScope, VistaVision, and later 3-D movies. They provided a brighter picture at all angles with top reflectivity at direct viewing and extra diffusion for side seats and balconies.

Carol Folt, the 11th chancellor and 29th chief executive, of the University of North Carolina at Chapel Hill was born in Akron in 1951. She was previously provost (chief academic officer) and interim president of Dartmouth College. She assumed her duties on July 1, 2013, and is the first woman to lead UNC.

The philosopher and logician Willard van Orman Quine was born and grew up in Akron.

Rabbi Mendy Sasonkin and his wife Kaila, as emissaries of the Lubavitcher Rebbe, founded Chabad of Akron/Canton in 1989. In 1995 Rabbi Sasonkin became the rabbi of Anshe Sfard Congregation.

In popular culture

In Needful Things, a 1991 novel by Stephen King, the character of Leland Gaunt is from Akron. Also, in the musical comedy Glee, Vocal Adrenaline, the New Directions' rivals, are from the fictional Carmel High School in Akron. In the 2007 dystopian novel Unwind (and its sequels), by Neal Shusterman, one of the main characters, Connor Lassiter, is dubbed the "Akron AWOL" after the city becomes the scene of his notorious escape from the Juvey-cops. An antique store in Akron also plays a key part in the Unwind series.

Thomas and Beulah, a 1986 book of poetry written by native and former Poet Laureate Consultant in Poetry to the Library of Congress, Rita Dove, tells the story of her grandmother and grandfather, who separately moved from the South to the city, where they lived through the Great Depression and the rest of their lives. The city is also the setting for the 2005 novel The Coast of Akron, by former editor of Esquire, Adrienne Miller. To reflect Akron's decline during the 1980s, Akron native Chrissie Hynde wrote the 1982 Pretenders song "My City Was Gone." The Black Keys' 2004 album title Rubber Factory refers to the former Goodrich Corporation rubber factory in which it was recorded. Akron serves as a setting in the 2002 first-person-shooter PC platform video game No One Lives Forever 2: A Spy In H.A.R.M.'s Way.

Sister cities
Akron, as of 2015, has two sister cities:

References

Further reading
 Joyce Dyer, Gum-Dipped: A Daughter Remembers Rubber Town. Akron: University of Akron Press, 2003.
 Kathleen Endres, Akron's Better Half: Women's Clubs and the Humanization of a City, 1825–1925, Akron: University of Akron Press, 2006.
 Kathleen L. Endres, Rosie the Rubber Worker: Women Workers in Akron's Rubber Factories during World War II. Kent: Kent State University Press, 2000
 Jack Gieck, A Photo Album of Ohio's Canal Era, 1825–1913, Revised Edition. Kent: Kent State University Press, 1992
 Jack Gieck, Early Akron's Industrial Valley: A History of the Cascade Locks. Kent: Kent State University Press, 2008
 Alfred Winslow Jones, Life, Liberty, & Property: A Story of Conflict and a Measurement of Conflicting Rights. Akron: University of Akron Press, 1999.
 S. A. Lane, Fifty Years and Over of Akron and Summit County. Akron, 1892.
 S. Love and David Giffels, Wheels of Fortune: The Story of Rubber in Akron, Ohio. Akron: University of Akron Press, 1998.
 S. Love, Ian Adams, and Barney Taxel, Stan Hywet Hall & Gardens. Akron: University of Akron Press, 2000.
 F. McGovern, Written on the Hills: The Making of the Akron Landscape. Akron: University of Akron Press, 1996.
 F. McGovern, Fun, Cheap, and Easy: My Life in Ohio Politics, 1949–1964. Akron: University of Akron Press, 2002.
 Russ Musarra and Chuck Ayers, Walks around Akron. Akron: University of Akron Press, 2007.
 Oscar E. Olin, et al., A Centennial History of Akron, 1825–1925. Summit County Historical Society, 1925.
 John S. Reese, Guide Book for the Tourist and Traveler over the Valley Railway, Revised Edition. Kent: Kent State University Press, 2002
 Akron Chamber of Commerce Year Book, (1913–14)

External links

 
 City of Akron official website
 History of Akron and Summit County
 
 
 

 
Cities in Ohio
Cities in Summit County, Ohio
Populated places established in 1825
County seats in Ohio
Populated places on the Underground Railroad
Western Reserve, Ohio